Strigilla is a genus of bivalves belonging to the family Tellinidae.

The genus has almost cosmopolitan distribution.

Species:

Strigilla australis 
Strigilla carnaria 
Strigilla chroma 
Strigilla cicercula 
Strigilla cyrenoidea 
Strigilla densestriata 
Strigilla dichotoma 
Strigilla elegans 
Strigilla elegantissima 
Strigilla ervilia 
Strigilla euronia 
Strigilla gabbi 
Strigilla georgiana 
Strigilla grasi 
Strigilla grossiana 
Strigilla interrupta 
Strigilla mirabilis 
Strigilla musanica 
Strigilla paraflexuosa 
Strigilla pisiformis 
Strigilla producta 
Strigilla protera 
Strigilla pseudocarnaria 
Strigilla salisburyi 
Strigilla serrata 
Strigilla sincera 
Strigilla sphaerion 
Strigilla splendida 
Strigilla surinamensis 
Strigilla tomlini

References

Tellinidae
Bivalve genera